This is a list of countries by natural gas production  based on statistics from The World Factbook, and OECD members natural gas production by International Energy Agency (down)

Countries by natural gas production
The data in the following table comes from The World Factbook.

OECD Members natural gas production by International Energy Agency

As of 2019:

See also 
 List of countries by natural gas proven reserves
 List of countries by natural gas consumption
 Natural gas by country
 World energy supply and consumption
 List of countries by oil production

References

Energy-related lists by country
 List